The Wyoming class was a pair of dreadnought battleships built for the United States Navy.  and  were authorized in early 1909, and were built between 1910 and 1912. These were the fourth dreadnought design of the US Navy, but only an incremental improvement over the preceding , and the last US battleships to use 12-inch guns. The primary changes were the adoption of a more powerful /50 caliber Mark 7 gun, addition of a sixth twin-gun turret and improved armor protection, including the first use of a torpedo bulkhead on American battleships. The Navy considered using more powerful  guns, but this would have caused delays and required larger docks.

The two ships frequently served together, first in the Atlantic Fleet in the 1910s. Both vessels were deployed to British waters after the United States entered World War I in April 1917 to reinforce the Royal Navy's Grand Fleet. They served in the Pacific Fleet in 1919–21, before both returned to the Atlantic Fleet. Much of their time in the Atlantic Fleet was spent conducting peacetime training exercises, along with taking midshipmen from the US Naval Academy on training cruises. Wyoming and Arkansas were heavily modernized in the mid-1920s, receiving more efficient oil-fired boilers to replace their old coal-fired models, thicker deck armor to protect against plunging fire, anti-torpedo bulges to increase their resistance to underwater damage, and anti-aircraft guns to defend against aerial attacks.

The London Naval Treaty of 1930 mandated that Wyoming be demilitarized; she accordingly was converted into a training ship, with half of her main battery turrets, belt armor, and anti-torpedo bulges removed.  However, Arkansas was permitted to continue in service with the fleet. After the United States entered World War II, Arkansas was used to escort convoys to North Africa. By 1944, she served as a coastal bombardment vessel; in this role, she supported Allied landings at Normandy (Operation Overlord) and southern France (Operation Dragoon) before being transferred to the Pacific, where she provided fire support to Marines fighting on Iwo Jima and at Okinawa in 1945. Wyoming meanwhile continued as a training ship, being modified further in 1944 to include the various types of anti-aircraft guns that trainees would operate in the fleet. Both ships were decommissioned shortly after the war, with Arkansas being expended as a target ship during the 1946 nuclear tests at Operation Crossroads, and Wyoming being sold for scrap in 1947.

Design 
On 22 July 1908, the Newport Conference was held; this included the General Board, the staff of the Naval War College, President Theodore Roosevelt—who had a keen interest in naval matters—and other officers. This conference examined a series of issues relating to existing battleships and new designs; the first of these new ships would become the Wyoming class. The Board on Construction received general instructions from the Newport Conference; those at the conference favored adopting the 14-inch gun, as the British Royal Navy had already traded their 12-inch guns for  pieces. The Bureau of Ordnance (BuOrd) estimated that design work on the new gun, production, and testing would take two years. On 26 August, the Secretary of the Navy, Victor Metcalf, issued a request for eight- and ten-gun battleships armed with the 14-inch weapons to the Bureau of Construction and Repair (C&R). Speed was to be at least , with as much armor as could be accommodated.

BuOrd argued that at likely battle ranges, the 12-inch gun was powerful enough to penetrate existing armor, and so the 14-inch gun was unnecessary. C&R produced three designs to meet Metcalf's request, all based on the preceding  design; the first, referred to as design 404, was a battleship armed with eight 14-inch guns. The second, design 502, had an additional twin turret for a total of ten 14-inch guns. The third, design 601, would be fitted with twelve 12-inch guns. The General Board chose 601, since the design work for the 14-inch gun had not begun, and adopting it would have caused the class to be delayed. In addition, the ships' displacement would have increased more dramatically with the larger gun, requiring extensive improvements to harbor facilities; design 502 would have only been able to dock in Pearl Harbor and Puget Sound with the existing facilities. The placement of the secondary battery also proved to be problematic. The cruise of the Great White Fleet in 1907–09 had demonstrated the problems with casemates on the main deck. They were too easily washed out in even moderate seas, making them unusable. Some officers at the Newport Conference had advocated placing them in the superstructure, but the heavy  guns used by the Navy would have added excessive top weight. Another alternative was to place them in the forecastle, but the additional weight forward would have strained the ship where the forecastle stepped down to the main deck. The designers ultimately settled on a full-length forecastle, which allowed the casemates to be moved about  higher in the hull.

The ships' armor protection was improved over earlier designs. The belt and barbette armor was increased by an inch compared to an earlier version of the twelve-gun battleship. A new protection scheme for the funnels was devised, after the Russian experience at the Battle of Tsushima three years before had highlighted the risk of a destroyed exhaust system. The designers also emphasized the need for improved underwater protection. As a result, the Wyomings design incorporated a torpedo bulkhead, the first time the feature was included on an American battleship design. Congress approved two new battleships, BB-32 and BB-33, on 3 March 1909. Design 502 later proved to be the basis for the subsequent class of battleships, the s.

General characteristics and machinery
They had a full length flush deck, which improved sea-keeping and the ability to work the secondary guns in heavier seas. Both ships were fitted with lattice masts. They had a crew of 58 officers and 1,005 enlisted men.

Steam was provided by twelve mixed oil and coal-fired Babcock & Wilcox boilers, which were trunked into two closely spaced funnels amidships. Steering was controlled by a single rudder.

Armament 

The ships were armed with a main battery of twelve 12-inch/50 caliber Mark 7 Mod 0 guns in six Mark IX twin-gun turrets all on the centerline, two of which were placed in a superfiring pair forward. The other four turrets were placed aft of the superstructure in two superfiring pairs. Wyoming and Arkansas were the only ships of the US Navy to receive the gun; earlier dreadnoughts were equipped with the lower-velocity 12-inch/45-caliber Mark 5 gun. The Mark 7 had significantly better armor penetrating capabilities, owing to its higher muzzle velocity (and thus higher striking velocity). The guns were mounted in the Mark IX gun turret, which allowed for elevation to 15 degrees and depression to −5 degrees. Unlike the turrets used on earlier dreadnoughts, the Mark IX turret required the guns to return to 0 degrees to reload.

The secondary battery consisted of twenty-one 5-inch/51 caliber guns mounted in casemates along the side of the hull. As was standard for capital ships of the period, they carried a pair of submerged  torpedo tubes in the hull on the broadside.

Armor
The belt reduced to  toward the stern. The forward end of the belt was connected with an 11 in thick transverse bulkhead with the forward-most main battery barbette, while the aft end of the belt was connected with a 9 in bulkhead.

Inboard of the casemate battery were longitudinal armored bulkheads; these were designed to protect the uptakes to the funnels. These were deemed important because during the Russo-Japanese War, three years before, Russian battleships had had their uptakes damaged, which ducted the boiler smoke into the ship rather than out through the funnels.

Modifications 
Both ships were significantly modified throughout their careers. During and shortly after World War I, the horizontal armor of the ships was improved, including the roofs of the conning tower and the gun turrets. Following the signing of the Washington Naval Treaty in February 1922, modernization work was strictly controlled. The treaty governed what modifications could be made to existing ships, and included restrictions on what could be changed or added. The primary areas that could be improved were those that concerned defense against aerial and underwater attack, along with propulsion systems.

The two Wyomings, along with the Floridas and New Yorks, were heavily modernized in the 1920s. All six ships were converted to completely oil-fired boilers with equipment taken from the cancelled South Dakota-class battleships. The boilers were trunked into a single funnel. The ships were also fitted with anti-torpedo bulges, which improved their underwater defense and also provided additional oil storage capacity. Wyoming and Arkansas lost their cage main mast, which was replaced by a short tripod mast that carried searchlights and radio antennas. Some of their secondary battery guns were relocated higher in the ship to improve their workability in heavy seas. A sponson for six guns was built into the hull abreast of the conning tower and the eight 3-inch anti-aircraft guns were moved to the top of the sponson. Both ships had their torpedo tubes removed.

Under the terms of the 1930 London Naval Treaty, Wyoming was to be demilitarized and converted into a training ship. During the demilitarization process, her anti-torpedo bulges, side armor, and half of her main battery guns were removed. Wyoming was modernized at Norfolk Navy Yard from 12 January to 3 April 1944; the reconstruction removed the last of her three 12-inch gun turrets, and replaced them with four twin and two single enclosed mounts for 5-inch/38 caliber guns. New fire control radars were also installed; these modifications allowed Wyoming to train anti-aircraft gunners with the most modern equipment they would use while in combat with the fleet. Modifications to Arkansas during World War II were kept to a minimum. In 1942, Arkansas received a new tripod foremast and bridgework, along with more anti-aircraft guns throughout the war. By 1945, she carried nine quadruple 40 mm Bofors mounts and twenty-eight 20 mm Oerlikons, and the number of 3-inch guns had been increased to ten.

Ships in class

Service history 

After entering service, both ships were assigned to the Atlantic Fleet. The ships took part in the normal routine of training and fleet maneuvers off the east coast of the United States and in the Caribbean, interspersed with periodic maintenance. Both ships toured the Mediterranean in late 1913, making stops in Italy and France, among others. In April 1914, Arkansas was involved in the occupation of Veracruz during the Mexican Revolution, and Wyoming arrived later to support the operation. Two men from Arkansas earned the Medal of Honor for their actions during the initial occupation of the city. After the United States declared war on Germany on 6 April 1917, Wyoming, along with the rest of Battleship Division 9 (BatDiv 9), steamed to Britain to reinforce the Royal Navy's Grand Fleet, stationed in Scapa Flow. Arkansas initially remained in the United States, training gun crews for the expanding wartime fleet. In July 1918, she too was sent to Britain. Neither ship saw action during the war, though they were present when the German High Seas Fleet surrendered in November 1918.

From mid-1919 to mid-1921, Arkansas and Wyoming served in the Pacific Fleet, with the latter serving as the flagship of BatDiv 6. During this time, the ships made a tour of Central and South American countries, culminating in a visit to Valparaiso, where they took part in a naval review for the Chilean president. Both battleships returned in service with the Atlantic Fleet in mid-1921. They returned to their peacetime routine of training and maneuvers and periodic maintenance. In the summers, the ships would generally take midshipmen from the US Naval Academy on training cruises. In June 1925, Arkansas assisted relief efforts after the 1925 Santa Barbara earthquake. From late 1925 to late 1926, Arkansas received her reconstruction, followed by Wyoming in 1927. In 1929 and 1930, Arkansas visited European waters on midshipmen cruises; she made stops in several countries. Wyoming was reduced to a training ship in 1931 in accordance with the London Naval Treaty, and she spent the next decade conducting training cruises for midshipmen and NROTC cadets.

From early 1932 to early 1934, Arkansas returned for another stint in the Pacific Fleet, followed by another tour of Europe later in the year. After the outbreak of World War II in September 1939, she was assigned to the reserve force for the Neutrality Patrols. She supported the occupation of Iceland in July 1941 as an escort for the troopship convoys. In November, as it became increasingly apparent that the United States would become involved in World War II, Wyoming was reassigned as a gunnery training ship, a role she served in for the duration of the war. Arkansas, meanwhile, continued in front-line service during the war, first as an escort to convoys to North Africa, and then as a shore bombardment vessel. She supported the landings at Normandy in June 1944, shelling German positions at Omaha Beach, before bombarding Cherbourg later in the month. Her next bombardment mission came with Operation Dragoon, the invasion of southern France, in August that year. She was then transferred to the Pacific Theater of Operations for action against the Japanese. She bombarded Japanese positions on Iwo Jima in February 1945 and on Okinawa in April.

With the end of the war in September 1945, Arkansas was employed with Operation Magic Carpet, repatriating American soldiers in the Pacific. Wyoming remained in service briefly after the war, though she was decommissioned in August 1947. She was sold for scrap in October and subsequently broken up. Arkansas was instead retained for use as a target ship during the Operation Crossroads nuclear tests in mid-1946. She survived the first test, an air-burst code-named ABLE, though the second experiment, an underwater detonation code-named BAKER, sank the ship.

Notes

Footnotes

Citations

References 
 
 
 
 
 
 
 
 

Battleship classes
 
World War I battleships of the United States